Beaconsfield is a suburb of Mackay in the Mackay Region, Queensland, Australia. In the  Beaconsfield had a population of 5,490 people.

Geography

History
The suburb was named after the Beaconsfield sugar plantation. It had a sugar crushing mill from about 1882 to 1893.

Mackay Wanderers Soccer Club was established in 1923.

In 1928 the Mackay Golf Club established a 9-hole course and club house in Beaconsfield on a  leased site. A further  were purchased in 1939, but due to World War II it was not until 1947 that a further 9 holes were established on this land.  A new club house was built in 1967. In 1981 the club constructed an on-site dam for irrigation with a second dam built in 1999. In 1985 the club changed its constitution to allow women to have full membership rights. Prior to coming to Beaconsfield, the club established a 9-hole golf course on the Mackay town common (later Mackay Airport) in 1925 with its first club house built in 1926 which was subsequently relocated to Beaconsfield.

Carlisle Adventist Christian College opened in 1950.

Kewarra State Special School opened on 21 February 1987. The school had been previously operated by the Endeavour Foundation. On 10 August 2002 it was renamed Mackay District Special School.

Whitsunday Anglican School opened on 27 January 1988.

Beaconsfield State School opened on 1 January 1999.

In the  Beaconsfield had a population of 5,490 people.

Education
Beaconsfield State School is a government primary (Prep-6) school for boys and girls at Nadina Street. In 2018, the school had an enrolment of 343 students with 27 teachers (23 full-time equivalent) and 33 non-teaching staff (22 full-time equivalent). It includes a special education program. The C&K Beaconsfield Community Kindergarten is on-site at the Beaconsfield State School.

Carlisle Adventist Christian College is a private primary and secondary (Prep-10) school for boys and girls at 17 Holts Road. In 2018, the school had an enrolment of 206 students with 20 teachers (18 full-time equivalent) and 15 non-teaching staff (10 full-time equivalent).

Whitsunday Anglican School is a private primary and secondary (Prep-12) school for boys and girls at Celeber Drive. In 2018, the school had an enrolment of 649 students with 62 teachers (58 full-time equivalent) and 34 non-teaching staff (31 full-time equivalent).

Mackay District Special School is a special primary and secondary (Prep-12) school for boys and girls at 63 Mansfield Drive.  It is available for students with a diverse range of abilities and special education requirements. In 2018, the school had an enrolment of 94 students with 23 teachers (22 full-time equivalent) and 29 non-teaching staff (21 full-time equivalent).

There is no government secondary school in Beaconsfield. The nearest government secondary schools are Pioneer State High School in neighbouring Andergrove to the east and Mackay North State High School in neighbouring North Mackay to the south-east.

Amenities
Mackay Golf Club operates an 18-hole golf course on Mackay-Bucasia Road for members and the public.

Mackay Wanderers Soccer Club is at 17 Ben Nevis Street.

There are a number of parks in the suburb, including:

 Broomdykes Park
 Eaglemount Park
 Emperor Drive Park
 Holmes Drive Park
 Mansfield Drive Park

References

External links
 

Mackay Region
Suburbs of Mackay, Queensland